Dalaca cocama is a species of moth of the family Hepialidae. It is known from Peru and Ecuador.

References

External links
Hepialidae genera

Moths described in 1937
Hepialidae
Moths of South America
Lepidoptera of Ecuador